Rush (released as Images in France) is the fifth studio album by Norwegian band Bel Canto, released on 22 February 1998 by EMI.

Reception

Dagbladet reviewer Håkon Moslet awarded the album dice 5, and Verdens Gang reviewer Stein Østbø also awarded the album dice 5.

Track listing

Personnel

Musicians
 Anneli Marian Drecker – vocals, two-handed tambourine
 Nils Johansen – guitar, violin, keyboards, bass, percussion, synthesizer Dx-7, programming
 Kirsti Nyutstumo – bass
 Ulf W.Ø. Holand – vocals
 Julian Briottet – vocals
 Torbjørn Brundtland – keyboards, percussion, one-finger tambourine, sampler
 Andreas Eriksen – drums, percussion, tablas
 Morten Lund – percussion

Technical
 Anneli Drecker, Nils Johansen, Torbjørn Brundtland – production
 Morten Lund – engineering
 Frode-André Kristiansen, Julian Briottet – engineering, mixing
 Ulf W. Ø. Holand, Nils Johansen, Anneli Drecker – mixing

Charts

References

1998 albums
Bel Canto (band) albums
EMI Records albums